George Mack is an American former Negro league pitcher who played in the 1940s.

Mack played for the New York Black Yankees in 1945. In 12 recorded appearances on the mound, he posted a 6.84 ERA over 51.1 innings.

References

External links
 and Baseball-Reference Black Baseball Stats and Seamheads

Year of birth missing
Place of birth missing
New York Black Yankees players